The 1918 Wansbeck by-election was a parliamentary by-election held for the House of Commons constituency of Wansbeck in Northumberland on 28 May 1918.

Vacancy

The by-election was caused by the death on 20 April 1918 of the sitting Liberal MP Rt Hon. Charles Fenwick, at the age of 68. He had held the seat since the general election of 1885. Fenwick was prominent figure in the Northumberland Miners' Association having first worked as a coal miner at the age of 10. He was one of a large group of miners representatives who refused to join the Labour party.

Electoral history
Fenwick, as a sponsored candidate of the Northumberland miners, had won the seat for the Liberals at every election since the seat was created in 1885. When the Miners Federation of Great Britain voted to affiliate to the Labour party in 1909, Fenwick, retaining the support of the Northumberland miners, contested both 1910 general elections as a Liberal candidate. The Labour party did not field a candidate against him and at the December 1910 general election he was returned unopposed. The last contested election in Wansbeck was the January 1910 contest;

Candidates

Liberals
Wansbeck Liberal Association adopted Alderman Robert Mason as their candidate to replace Fenwick. Mason was a 60-year-old shipping agent and shipowner  with local government and community connections. He was an Alderman of Northumberland County Council and a Justice of the Peace.

Conservatives
As participants in the wartime coalition with Prime Minister, David Lloyd George, the Conservatives chose not to contest the by-election. Given that they normally polled poorly, this was not much of a sacrifice.

Labour
Despite the Liberal tradition in Wansbeck, and the fact that Fenwick had been unopposed at the last general election, and despite the wartime electoral party truce, the local Labour Party decided to contest the by-election and selected a local 34-year-old coal miner from Ashington, Ebenezer Edwards.  Edwards was the nominee of the Northumberland Miners' Association and received the support of the Miners' Federation of Great Britain. He was not actually endorsed by the National Executive of the Labour party, because of the wartime electoral truce. Edwards was an opponent of the war and had chosen to remain working in the mines rather than enlist.

Campaign
Polling day was set for 28 May 1918, 38 days after the death of Fenwick, allowing for an unusually long campaign.

Result
Mason retained the seat for the Liberal party with a majority of 547 votes over Edwards.

The result was a narrow endorsement by the electorate for the government’s handling of the war effort, both in military terms and industrially on the home front. However Labour could claim to be wresting the traditional mining vote away from the Liberals.

Aftermath
Soon after the Wansbeck result Labour’s National Executive Committee formally refused to renew the wartime truce between the political parties. Edwards took on Mason again for Labour at the 1918 general election but with a larger electorate and the national swing behind him, Mason increased his majority to 3,399.

References

See also
List of United Kingdom by-elections 
United Kingdom by-election records
1929 Wansbeck by-election
1940 Wansbeck by-election

1918 elections in the United Kingdom
1918 in England
20th century in Northumberland
By-elections to the Parliament of the United Kingdom in Northumberland constituencies